The 10th Annual Japan Record Awards took place at the Shibuya Public Hall in Shibuya, Tokyo, on December 21, 1968, starting at 02:30PM JST. The ceremony were televised in Japan on TBS, and the video are the earliest recordings of JRA that saved by TBS.

Emcee
Ayurou Miki
4th time as the emcee for JRA.

Award Winners
Japan Record Award
 Jun Mayuzumi for "Tenshi No Yuwaku" 
 Lyricist: Rei Nakanishi
 Composer: Kunihiko Suzuki
 Arranger: Kunihiko Suzuki
 Record Company: EMI Music Japan

Vocalist Award
 Youichi Sugawara for "Dare Mo Inai" 
 Mina Aoe for "Isezakicho Blues" and other songs.
 Masayoshi Tsuruoka & Tokyo Romantica for "Tabiji No Hito Yo"

New Artist Award
 Ken Yabuki for "Anata No Blues" 
 Kaori Kumi for "Kuchizuke Ga Kowai" 
 Pinky & Killers for "Koi No Kisetsu" 

Lyricist Award
 Tetsurou Hoshino for "Tsuya Uta", "Ougizuka" and other lyrics.
 Singer: Kiyoko Suizenji, Midori Sasa

Composer Award
 Taku Izumi for "Koi No Kisetsu" and other songs.
 Singer: Pinky & Killers
Awarded again after 5 years, 2nd composer award.

Arranger Award
 Kenichirou Morioka for "Koi No Shizuku" & "Hana To Chou" and other arrangements.
 Singer: Yukari Itou & Shinichi Mori
 Awarded again after 2 years, 2nd arranger award.

Planning Award
 JVC for "Kage Wo Shitaite"
 Awarded again after 3 years, 2nd planning award.
 Singer: Shinichi Mori

Children's Song Award
 Yoshimi Hasegawa for "Peke No Uta"

Special Award
 Tadashi Yoshida
 Hachiro Kasuga
Song: Wakare No Ipponsugi
 Chiyoko Shimakura for "Ai No Sazanami" and other sentimental ballads.
 The Folk Crusaders for "Kaette Kita Yopparai"

10th Anniversary Commemorative Award
Koga Masao
Ryōichi Hattori

References

Japan Record Awards
Japan Record Awards
Japan Record Awards
Japan Record Awards
1968